Elgar Howarth (born 4 November 1935), is an English conductor, composer and trumpeter.

Biography
Howarth was born at Cannock, Staffordshire.  He was educated in the 1950s at Manchester University and the Royal Manchester College of Music (the predecessor of the Royal Northern College of Music), where his fellow students included the composers Harrison Birtwistle, Alexander Goehr, Peter Maxwell Davies and the pianist John Ogdon. Together they formed New Music Manchester, a group dedicated to the performance of new music.

He has worked with all leading British orchestras, as well as many orchestras worldwide. He played the opening bars of Tippett's King Priam at its Coventry premiere in 1962, (conducting the whole work years later for English National Opera).
He has conducted many operas, and premiered György Ligeti's Le Grand Macabre at the Royal Swedish Opera in  Stockholm in 1978 and four operas by Harrison Birtwistle: The Mask of Orpheus at English National Opera (1986),  Yan Tan Tethera for Opera Factory (1986), Gawain at the Royal Opera House in London (1991) and The Second Mrs Kong at Glyndebourne (1994).  He was Principal Guest Conductor of Opera North from 1985 to 1988, and Music Advisor to the company from 2002 to 2004.

As a composer and former trumpet player, he writes mainly for brass instruments. Swedish trumpeter Håkan Hardenberger has premiered several of his works on cornet, including his Cornet Concerto, Canto, and Capriccio. He has written arrangements such as The Carnival of Venice Variations for brass ensemble  and Modest Mussorgsky's Pictures at an Exhibition arranged for brass band. Composer Roy Newsome remarks that "Howarth's masterly rendition of Mussorgsky's Pictures at an Exhibition (1979) dwarfed all previous transcriptions."

He was brought up in a brass band family and has maintained his interest in the art form. Howarth has made a huge contribution to the modern repertoire of brass band music. Many of his works are recorded, most notably by the Grimethorpe Colliery Band and the Eikanger-Bjørsvik band.  He also was one of the trumpeters who performed with The Beatles on the song "Magical Mystery Tour".

A number of personal copies of works he has conducted (some including annotations) are catalogued at the University of East Anglia's School of Music.

In December 2003, he was revealed to have rejected a CBE.

References 

1935 births
Living people
Alumni of the Royal Northern College of Music
Alumni of the University of Manchester
Brass band composers
Brass band conductors
English classical trumpeters
Male trumpeters
English composers
English conductors (music)
British male conductors (music)
Opera North
People from Cannock
People from Eccles, Greater Manchester
Honorary Members of the Royal Academy of Music
Laurence Olivier Award winners